The Men's 4 x 7.5 kilometre biathlon relay competition at the 1984 Winter Olympics 17 February, at Igman - Veliko Polke. Each national team consisted of four members, with each skiing 7.5 kilometres and shooting twice, once prone and once standing.

At each shooting station, a competitor has eight shots to hit five targets; however, only five bullets are loaded in a magazine at one - if additional shots are required, the spare bullets must be loaded one at a time. If after the eight shots are taken, there are still targets not yet hit, the competitor must ski a 150-metre penalty loop.

Summary 

The Soviet Union, the reigning world champions, and having never lost this event in the Olympics, and East Germany, which had won four consecutive world titles before the Soviets took the title in 1983, were the main favourites. Dmitry Vasilyev gave the Soviets a lead of more than a minute after the first leg. The East Germans cut the lead to thirty seconds after the second leg, while Norway, which had started disastrously, with Odd Lirhus taking two penalty loops, had sprint champion Eirik Kvalfoss move them up to third.

The East Germans then moved ahead on the third leg, after Algimantas Šalna had to go on the penalty loop twice himself. However, Frank Ullrich, winner of 9 world championship gold medals, and three medals at the last Olympics, struggled with his skiing, only having the 10th fastest leg, and leaving his team fourth. For the Soviets, it was another story, Sergei Bulygin shooting clear and skiing a quick leg to win his side gold. They held off a hard charge from the Norwegians, as Kjell Søbak followed his teammate Kvalfoss in putting up the fastest leg to earn silver. Individual champion Peter Angerer had put the West Germans third going into the final leg, and while Fritz Fischer did not make up ground on the Soviets, they did move into bronze position by passing their East German opponents.

Results

References

Men's relay